Vikhroli (Marathi pronunciation: [ʋikʰɾoɭiː]) is a suburb of Mumbai located on the northeastern side of the city. The suburb has a railway station by the name Vikhroli on the Central Railway line.

It is also home to one of the largest mangrove forests in Maharashtra, India.

See also
Vikhroli railway station

References

Suburbs of Mumbai